Carole Highlands is an unincorporated community located in Prince George's County, Maryland, United States. Carole Highlands is contained between East West Highway (MD 410) to the south, University Boulevard (MD 193) to the north, Larch Avenue, Hopewell Avenue, and 15th Avenue to the west, and Riggs Road (MD 212) to the east. Carole Highlands borders the adjacent neighborhoods of Chillum, Green Meadows, Lewisdale, and Langley Park in Prince George's County, while bordering the city of Takoma Park in Montgomery County, MD. For statistical purposes, it is part of the Chillum census-designated place (CDP).

Physical geography 
Carole Highlands mainly includes single-family houses as well as the Riggs Hill Condominium Complex. Since Carole Highlands is an unincorporated community in Prince George's County, Maryland, Carole Highlands lacks its own neighborhood address and zipcode. As a result, most of the businesses and residences located within Carole Highlands, are assigned Hyattsville addresses, containing the Hyattsville/Adelphi zipcode of 20783 while a few business and residences located on the far western boundary of Carole Highlands, next to the Prince George's County/ Montgomery County Line, are assigned Takoma Park addresses, containing the Takoma Park zipcode of 20912. Carole Highlands was a planned community was named for the developer's daughter, Carole, and because much of it is literally on "high land." At the very top of the neighborhood is a water tower.

A -high dendritic ridge runs north and south through the neighborhood just west of 16th Place. The ridgeline divides the Sligo Creek watershed from the Northwest Branch watershed. When the leaves are off the trees, from various points on the ridge there is a clear view of the Shepherd Park and Brightwood neighborhoods of Washington, D.C. (3 miles west); of the Basilica of the National Shrine of the Immaculate Conception (3 miles south-southwest); and of Carmody Hills, Maryland (8 miles southeast).

Roads, hiker-biker trails, and political geography 

Carole Highlands is located within a residential section east of 15th Avenue, northeast of Sligo Creek Park and MD-410 (East-West Highway), west of MD-212 (Riggs Road) and south of MD-193 (University Boulevard).

The only direct road access into the neighborhood is via Erskine Street (from New Hampshire Avenue) or Drexel Street (from Riggs Road).

Elson Street and Sligo Parkway East give Carole Highlands two access points to Sligo Creek Trail, which was designated a National Recreation Trail in 2006 (external link here). The paved and shaded hiker-biker trail links directly to the Anacostia Trail System and thus to the American Discovery Trail that crosses the United States from Delaware to California. However, most Carole Highlands residents use Sligo Creek Trail less frequently as an access point for coast-to-coast tours than for Bicycle commuting, family outings and jogging.

The western boundary of the Carole Highlands neighborhood is the current border between Montgomery County, Maryland and Prince George's County, Maryland, behind the backyards of the houses in Carole Highlands that face 15th Avenue. The section of Carole Highlands consists of single-family houses, starts at the Prince George's County/ Montgomery County Line and ends on East-West Highway (MD 410), the portion of Riggs Road (MD 212) south of Drexel Street, and 17th Avenue. Between portion of Carole Highlands, where Drexel Street/ Erskine Street east of 17th Avenue, and where Riggs Road intersects Drexel Street, north of East-West Highway (MD 410), near University Boulevard (MD 193), is where the "Riggs Hill Condominium Complex, which is the only condominium complex in Carole Highlands, is located. There are absolutely no apartment complexes located within the community of Carole Highlands whatsoever. On maps, the neighborhood is east of Hopewell Avenue, Larch Avenue, and 15th Avenue but north of East-West Highway (MD 410), south of University Boulevard East (MD 193), and west of Riggs Road (MD 212). Homes located east of New Hampshire Avenue (MD 650), but west of 15th Avenue are part of the City of Takoma Park's Ward 6 in Montgomery County.

Plants and animals 
The neighborhood is lined with a canopy of mature trees. For this reason, Carole Highlands appears as a dark green patch on satellite images of the Washington area.

Many of the trees belong to species native to the local ecological region, the Piedmont region of Maryland. Some of the local tree species are oak, maple, birch, beech, elm, cherry, weeping cherry, spruce, pine, sassafras and flowering dogwood.

Mammals: Squirrels, raccoons and opossums are commonly seen and badgers, foxes and deer are seen occasionally.

Some bird species that have been spotted in local backyards are cardinals, titmice, robins, ospreys, crows, woodpeckers, flickers, mockingbirds, wood thrushes, gray catbirds, cowbirds, chickadees, blue jays, mourning doves, towhees, summer tanagers, goldfinches, house and purple finches and the ubiquitous species starling and sparrow. Kingfishers, herons and hawks are seen near Sligo Creek.

History 
The largest section of the neighborhood was developed as a planned community by Carl M. Freeman Associates, Inc. (now the Carl M. Freeman Companies) beginning in 1947. The development maximized the preservation of oak trees hundred of years old by arranging houses on large (6000-12,000 square foot) lots contoured to respect the section's ridges and slopes. According to the company's website (here), the development won an award. Carole Highlands was the first and only suburban housing developed after World War II in the entire Washington, D.C. metro area which sold homes to all comers WITHOUT discriminatory covenants.  Carole Highlands takes pride in having been an integrated community from its beginning and continues to shelter and celebrate its diversity.  The community is integrated in every way possible.

The house styles of the development included traditional two-story "brick colonial" and -story "Dutch colonial" models; the then-new "California Cottage home" designed by Carl Freeman himself as a "truly livable space" with a naturally flowing connection with the outdoors; one-story frame ranch houses and, at the edge of the formal Carole Highlands Section on 17th Avenue, a row of attached (double) family homes. Some of the detached Freeman houses were subsequently enlarged with dormers or one or two-story additions, while others are still in their pristine state to the current day.

In 1960, the neighborhood Citizen's Association successfully brought a legal case against the Board of County Commissioners of Prince George's County. As a result, the court prohibited the building of  a gas station on lot C-2.

The portion of Takoma Park located west of 15th Avenue, but east of Prince George's Avenue, Merrimac Drive, and Carroll Avenue, was originally located in Prince George's County, Maryland, from up until July 1, 1997. Earlier in 1997, residents living within the portion of Takoma Park located within Prince George's County, voted affirmatively to unify the City of Takoma Park under the jurisdiction of Montgomery County. The county line was shifted, changing Prince George's County's boundaries for the first time since 1791.

Home ownership in the neighborhood experienced turnover after the year 2000, as many long-term residents retired and sold their homes to younger newcomers. In 2004, Carole Highlands was featured as one of the best places to live in a local monthly magazine. The speculative real estate boom attracted "flippers" who expected to pocket a $100,000 profit in two years as housing prices spiraled. The subsequent real estate "bust" left many who bought at the top of the market under water with their mortgages however resulted in a default rate for the neighborhood amazingly lower (at 0.02% to date) than the prevailing default rates in Montgomery and Prince George's counties and the general rate in the state of Maryland. Most defaults involved over-leveraged speculators who never intended to settle and mis-timed the market. Residents still include some of Carole Highlands' now elderly "pioneers" who were the original or very early owners of their respective homes and three generations of their heirs and people who grew up in this family-friendly neighborhood and bought homes in the neighborhood where they now raise their own children. Today, many Carole Highlands residents work in nearby in Washington, D.C.or Silver Spring or College Park Maryland. Plumbers and professors live side by side.

Education

Primary and secondary schools

Public schools 
Students from Carole Highlands Section in Prince George's County are currently assigned to Carole Highlands Elementary School—located within the section, Buck Lodge Middle School and High Point High School.  Prince George's County Public Schools.

See * Carole Highlands Elementary School
 Buck Lodge Middle School
 High Point High School

Places of Worship
In 2003, the Turner Memorial AME congregation purchased the large church building within the section from the Wallace Memorial  Presbyterian congregation that formerly occupied its multiple lots. Two Protestant and one Roman Catholic churches are located within easy walking distance on near-by New Hampshire Avenue.

Public libraries 
The closest public library to Carole Highlands is the Takoma Park Library. This library is at Philadelphia and Maple Avenues, about one and a half miles west of Carole Highlands via bicycle paths and residential streets. The Takoma Park Library is a department of the City of Takoma Park, and is the only independent (not county-run) municipal library in the state of Maryland. It has a children's book room, an adults' book room and a periodicals reading area. Residents of the City of Takoma Park automatically have borrowing privileges, and Prince George's County residents may obtain full borrowing privileges for an annual fee of $10.

The second closest public library to Carole Highlands is the Hyattsville Library. This library is on Adelphi Road to the east of the Prince George's Plaza shopping mall, about two miles (3 km) east of Carole Highlands via MD-212 and MD-410. It has a children's book room, an adults' book room, a computer area and a periodicals reading area. The Hyattsville Library is also the site of the Maryland Room, decorated in the style of a parlor in a Colonial manor house of the 18th century and housing a historical and genealogical collection that focuses on Maryland.

Current issues of interest to residents

Purple Line and associated development
One issue of interest to Carole Highlands residents is the status of the Purple Line transit project.

Two Purple Line stations are planned nearby: the Takoma-Langley station at the intersection of MD-650 New Hampshire Ave x MD-193 University Boulevard East and the Riggs Road station at MD-212 Riggs Road x MD-193 University Bouleward. These two intersections are within less than a mile of the northwest and northeast corners of the Carole Highlands neighborhood. [To see the locations, click here  for a map of the proposed Purple Line route, published by the Washington Post, May 31, 2007, and here for a street map with a pointer to Carole Highlands. To see the official planning maps, click on CFG-06-03 (Riggs Road Station) or CFG-06-02 (Takoma/Langley Station) at the Maryland Transit Authority website.]

The transit line would provide more commuting options to residents as a connection west to Bethesda and east to the New Carollton MARC and Metro stations. Because tall wrought-iron fences erected along the section's northern border block direct access from University Boulevard into Carole Highlands, the transit line itself is unlikely to alter the quiet character of the neighborhood.

However, the Planning Boards of Montgomery and Prince George's county for the Takoma Langley Crossroads (TLC) "transit-oriented development" envision vastly increased residential and commercial density around the two planned local stations that may impact the neighborhood—with or without the Purple Line.

In March 2007, the administration of recently inaugurated Maryland Governor O'Malley announced that the previous administration had underestimated likely ridership on this and two other potential new transit lines (e.g. this March 7, 2007 article from Gazette.Net). Accurate ridership estimates are important to secure federal funding for new transit projects. Costs of the Purple Line are estimated in the billions of dollars and the earliest year it may be operational is 2017.

Sligo Master Plan
Under the plan proposed by the Montgomery County Planning Board in May 2010 to rezone and redevelop its section of the Takoma Langley Crossroads sector and the City of Takoma Park's consistent plan to revitalize commercial uses along New Hampshire Avenue, land lots zoned commercial at the intersection of Sligo Creek Parkway and New Hampshire Avenue may be further developed.  According to the "Sligo Master Plan" article in the May 2007 issue of the Takoma Park Newsletter, nearby residents "enthusiastically" expressed desires for encouraging such businesses on the lots as a small neighborhood pub, a cafe, a bicycle shop and rental business and a hardware store.

Takoma Langley Crossroads Plan
The plan approved in 2009 for the Takoma Langley Crossroads Section in Prince George's County, however, envisions massive redevelopment (=demolition and rebuilding). Approximately half the homes in the Carole Highlands Section (206 houses north of Erskine Avenue) were included in the Sectional Map Amendment (SMA) area of that PG plan.  In the first phase (5–10 years), redevelopment would come up to the very boundary of the community as PG planners seek to demolish most buildings of the Riggs Hill Condominium between 18th Avenue and Riggs Road to convert them to multi-use: 3-4 floors of apartments above retail stores. In the third phase (15 to 25 years hence), the PG county plan calls for the "redevelopment" of the area of Carole Highlands included in the SMA into far more intense "medium density" land use—a term which is not associated with the existing zoning for single-family homes on spacious lots.
Owner-occupants of Carole Highlands homes filed a class action suit in Circuit Court less than a month after the County Council "initiated" (began) the SMA process of rezoning land use.  The plaintiff class is currently expanding and reaching out to affected homeowners in other areas within the Takoma Langley Crossroad sectors of Prince George's and Montgomery County to prevent the rezoning of their properties and the intrusion of commercial activities into residential neighborhoods. The class may potentially expand to include owner occupants of the three spacious garden-style condominium communities, two of which the PG plan targets for demolition and conversion to multiuse and the third of which it targets for rebuilding into a higher density apartment complexes and the single-family homes PG plan targets for  demolition and redevelopment as dense apartment buildings.
The Montgomery County Council will hold a hearing on its county's  Takoma Langley Sector plan in May 2011.  As of March 2011, no timetable has been set for publication or a hearing on the proposed rezoning within the SMA of Prince George's County's TLC plan.

Statistics and elected officials 
Latitude: 38.98139 N
Longitude: 76.98361 W
County Council:
For current Montgomery County councilmembers, check MC District 5 externally.
For current Prince George's County  councilmembers, check PG District 2 externally.
Maryland House of Delegates:
District 20 (Montgomery County)
District 47 (Prince George's County)
For current Maryland state delegates, check district on this list or externally.
Maryland State Senate:
District 20 (Montgomery County)
District 47 (Prince George's County)
For current Maryland state senators, check district on this list or externally.
United States House of Representatives:
Maryland District 8 (both counties)
Chris Van Hollen, current U.S. representative.
United States Senate:
Barbara A. Mikulski and Ben Cardin, current U.S. senators.
Governor of Maryland:
Larry Hogan
Lieutenant Governor of Maryland:
Boyd Rutherford

References

External links 
Location in the DC Metro area
Map of proposed Purple Line route , published by the Washington Post, May 31, 2007
Topo map with streets, elevation contours and landmarks
Map of the Carole Highlands Elementary School District
Gazette.net article 01/11/2007 "At Carole Highlands [Elementary School], small groups spell success on MSA"
The original builders, Carl M. Freeman Associates
Sligo Creek Trail
Friends of Sligo Creek
the nearby International Corridor/Gateway Arts District

Unincorporated communities in Montgomery County, Maryland
Unincorporated communities in Prince George's County, Maryland
Washington metropolitan area
Unincorporated communities in Maryland